The 2018–19 Elite League, also known as 2018–19 Hero Elite League for sponsorship reasons and formerly known as Youth League U18 was the eleventh season of the Indian Elite League and the fourth season of the competition as an under-18 one. Shillong Lajong were the defending champions, but could not advance to knock out stage.

Qualifiers

Kolkata zone
The qualifiers for Kolkata Zone were divided in two groups with five teams in each group, with SAI (East Zone), United S.C., and Rainbow AC advanced to the zonal round.

Group A

Group B

Maharashtra zone

Zonal round

Delhi zone

Karnataka–Andhra zone
The matches of Karnataka–Andhra zone kicked off on 8 October 2018 with Ananthpur Sports Academy defeating Boca Juniors 2–0 in the opening game.

Chennai zone

Kolkata zone

Maharashtra zone

Shillong–Guwahati zone

Goa zone

Jharkhand–Odisha zone

Punjab zone

Rest Of India zone

Group A 
All matches were played at Panampally Ground, Kochi.

Group B 
All matches were played at Khuman Lampak Turf Ground, Imphal.

Group C
All matches will be played at TRC Turf Ground, Srinagar.

Group D
All matches were played at Kahaani Sports Academy Ground, Ahmedabad.

Playoffs 
Ten teams entered this round, out of which five will progress to the final round.

Group A
All matches played at Navelim Ground, Margao.

Group B
All matches played at Navelim Ground, Margao.

Final round

Group A
All matches played at Nagoa Ground, Nagoa.

Group B
Matches played at Don Bosco Ground, Borda and Nagoa Ground, Nagoa.

Group C
All matches played at Utorda Ground, Utorda.

Group D
All matches played at Utorda Ground, Utorda.

Knockout stage

Bracket

Quarter-finals

Semi-finals

Final

Statistics

Top scorers

Clean Sheets

References

External links
 Elite League on the I-League website.

Youth League U18
2018–19 in Indian football